The men's 1500 metres speed skating competition of the 2018 Winter Olympics was held on 13 February 2018 at the Gangneung Oval in Gangneung. Kjeld Nuis posted a time 0.06 seconds short of the Olympic record and won the gold medal. Patrick Roest won silver, and Kim Min-seok bronze, becoming the first Asian athlete to ever medal in this event. For all three of them, it was their first Olympic race and first Olympic medal. The defending champion Zbigniew Bródka, as well as the 2014 silver, Koen Verweij, and bronze, Denny Morrison, medalists participated in the event but finished outside of the top 10.

Records
Prior to this competition, the existing world, Olympic and track records were as follows.

The following records were set during this competition.

Results
The races were held at 20:00.

References

Men's speed skating at the 2018 Winter Olympics